Golden Vessyl of Sound is the fourth studio album by Yume Bitsu, released on May 7, 2002 through K Records.

Track listing

Personnel 
Adapted from the Golden Vessyl of Sound liner notes.

Yume Bitsu
Adam Forkner – vocals, guitar, engineering
 Franz Prichard – guitar
Additional musicians
 Jason Anderson – drums (1, 7), guitar (6)
 Alex Bundy – keyboards (1, 3–7), guitar (2)
 Daniel Eaton – trombone (6)
 McCloud Zicmuse – alto clarinet (6)

Production and additional personnel
 Wade Chamberlain – mastering
 Johannah Goldstein – cover art

Release history

References

External links 
 

2002 albums
K Records albums
Yume Bitsu albums